Peter Daniel McCartney (born June 16, 1962) is a former American football tackle who played for the New York Jets of the National Football League (NFL). He played college football at University of Louisville.

References 

1962 births
Living people
American football offensive tackles
Louisville Cardinals football players
New York Jets players
East Rockaway High School alumni